Unzipped may refer to:
 Unzipped (film), a 1995 documentary film 
 Unzipped (TV series), a comedy British television programme
 Unzipped, a 2001 television news magazine hosted by Catherine Clark
 Unzipped, a monthly gay pornographic magazine owned by LPI Media
 Unzipped, a 1999 book by Bronwyn Donaghy
 Unzipped: A Toolkit for Life, a 2007 book by Matt Whyman
 Unzipped, a 2007 memoir by Suzi Quatro
 Unzipped, a 1995 EP by Low Pop Suicide
 Unzipped, a 1998 comedy album by Pat Paulsen